|}

The Cathedral Stakes is a listed flat horse race in Great Britain open to horses aged three years or older.
It is run at Salisbury over a distance of 6 furlongs (1,206 metres), and it is scheduled to take place each year in June.

The race was first run in 2002.

Records

Leading jockey (4 wins):
 Richard Hughes – Edge Closer (2008), Elnawin (2011), Libranno (2012), Professor (2013)

Leading trainer (4 wins):
 Richard Hannon Sr. – Edge Closer (2008), Elnawin (2011), Libranno (2012), Professor (2013)

Winners

See also 
 Horse racing in Great Britain
 List of British flat horse races

References
Racing Post

Flat races in Great Britain
Salisbury Racecourse
Open sprint category horse races
2002 establishments in England
Recurring sporting events established in 2002